Solonia is a monotypic genus of flowering plants belonging to the family Primulaceae, with just contains one species, Solonia reflexa Urb.

It grows  as a shrub and is native to Cuba.

The genus name of Solonia is in honour of Solon (c. 640 BC – c. 560 BC), an Athenian statesman, lawmaker and poet. The Latin specific epithet of reflexa means bent backwards or reflexed from reflecto. Both the genus and the species were first described and published in Repert. Spec. Nov. Regni Veg. Vol.18 on pages 22–23 in 1922.

References

Primulaceae
Primulaceae genera
Plants described in 1922
Flora of Cuba
Flora without expected TNC conservation status